Jamania can refer to: 
Jamania, Ghazipur district
Jamania, Pilibhit district
Jamunia, Madhya Pradesh a.k.a.  Jamania, Madhya Pradesh